James Anthony Sturgess (born 16 May 1978) is an English actor and singer-songwriter. His first major role was as Jude in the musical romance drama film Across the Universe (2007). In 2008, he played the male lead role of Ben Campbell in 21. In 2009, he played Gavin Kossef in the crime drama Crossing Over, appearing with Harrison Ford, Ray Liotta, and Ashley Judd. In 2010, Sturgess starred in the film The Way Back, directed by Peter Weir. Sturgess co-starred in the 2012 epic science fiction film Cloud Atlas.

Personal life

Sturgess was born in Wandsworth, London, but grew up in Farnham, Surrey, where he attended Frensham Heights School. He spent most of his youth skateboarding in local car parks and started his first band when he was about 15 years old. The band played gigs in and around his local area. Sturgess's first acting experience came when a local theatre group came to his school looking for children to audition for a play. Sturgess went along to the audition and landed one of the parts in the play.

Sturgess moved to Manchester to attend the University of Salford in the hope that it would enable him to continue his music and take part in the Manchester music scene. In Greater Manchester, he fell in with a group of aspiring actors and film makers, and his acting efforts began to become productive. He started to write and perform his own short films and plays. While performing a one-man show 'BUZZIN', based on his performance poetry, Jim was discovered by an acting agent. He graduated from the University of Salford in 1999 with an HND in Media and Performance.

On 30 July 2019, Sturgess married theatre producer Dina Mousawi in Italy.

Acting career
In 2007, he was cast in Julie Taymor's musical Across the Universe, portraying Jude Feeny, a young man who travels to the US amid the raging throes of the late 1960s and falls in love with a sheltered American teenager, Lucy, played by Evan Rachel Wood.

In 2008, he appeared in the historical drama The Other Boleyn Girl in the supporting role of George Boleyn opposite Natalie Portman, Scarlett Johansson, and Eric Bana. He also played the male lead role of Ben Campbell in 21, a film about five MIT students who, by counting cards, take Las Vegas casinos for millions. Sturgess's co-stars in 21 include Kevin Spacey and Laurence Fishburne.

In 2009, he played Gavin Kossef in Crossing Over, appearing with Harrison Ford, Ray Liotta, and Ashley Judd. Set in Los Angeles, the story revolves around immigrants from different countries and backgrounds who share a common bond: they are all desperately trying to gain legal-immigrant status. Also in 2009, he starred in Kari Skogland's critically acclaimed Fifty Dead Men Walking, loosely based on the true story related in a best-selling book by Martin McGartland, of a young Northern Irishman who is recruited by the British police to infiltrate and spy on the Irish Republican Army, and who in the process ends up saving about 50 innocent lives.

Heartless, a film directed by Philip Ridley, premiered on 31 August 2009 at the London FrightFest Film Festival, a popular horror film festival. Sturgess appears as Jamie Morgan, a young man whose life has always been blighted by the large, heart-shaped port wine birthmark on his face and sells his soul to the devil. Jim Sturgess won the Best Actor Award at the 2010 Fantasporto Film Festival for his role. The film also won the Best Film Award and the Best Director Award for Philip Ridley.

In 2010, Sturgess starred in the film The Way Back, directed by Peter Weir and based on a true story. The character Sturgess plays is based on Sławomir Rawicz, a young Polish officer who escaped from a Russian gulag during World War II. Also in 2010, he did voice-over work for director Zack Snyder's 3-D animated feature film Legend of the Guardians: The Owls of Ga'Hoole, based on the children's book series Guardians of Ga'Hoole by Kathryn Lasky, in which he voiced Soren, the main protagonist of the film. He was originally set to voice Soren's brother Kludd, one of the main antagonists, but the part went to Ryan Kwanten.

In May 2010, Sturgess signed on to appear in One Day (based on the novel of the same title by David Nicholls) with Anne Hathaway. The novel, about two students who meet on 15 July 1988, follows them on every 15 July for the next 20 years. Directed by Lone Scherfig, filming was completed on 17 September 2010 and had its theatrical release in August 2011.

Also during 2010, he filmed Upside Down. Filming was completed in May 2010 in Montreal, and as of early 2013 a limited international release was planned. Described as a "sci-fi romance", the film is the second full-length feature from writer and director Juan Solanas. It was originally slated for release in 2011, but delays pushed back the release date.

A third film project in 2010 was Promised Land, to be directed by Michael Winterbottom and, according to Variety, would "recount the lead up to the 1948 partition of Palestine and the subsequent creation of the state of Israel". Sturgess was to star as a British officer hunting down the extremist Jewish factions. The film was later put on hiatus because funding could not be secured.

In March and April 2011, filming took place for Ashes, a film directed by Mat Whitecross. The picture has been described as a contemporary film noir thriller starring Ray Winstone and Lesley Manville along with Sturgess. Filmed in the Isle of Man, the production was partially funded by the band Coldplay, university friends of the director. Sturgess co-starred in Cloud Atlas, which began filming in September 2011 and was released in October 2012.

Sturgess worked on two films during 2012. Giuseppe Tornatore's The Best Offer (original title 'La Migliore Offerta') was filmed during the spring in Prague, Vienna, and several cities in Italy. Co-starring Geoffrey Rush and Sylvia Hoeks, the film went on to win the David di Donatello Award for Best Film. In the autumn, Sturgess went to Los Angeles to film Electric Slide, directed by Tristan Patterson and co-starring Isabel Lucas and Chloe Sevigny. An official selection of the Tribeca Film Festival, it premiered there in 2014 as part of the Viewpoint selections.

In the last half of 2013, Sturgess worked in three films. The first was Stonehearst Asylum, co-starring Kate Beckinsale and directed by Brad Anderson, in the summer. Loosely based on the short story "The System of Doctor Tarr and Professor Fether" by Edgar Allan Poe, Sturgess stars as a medical school graduate who visits an asylum for the insane. The film was released in October 2014. London Fields, based on the novel by Martin Amis, was next, filmed in London and co-starring Amber Heard and Billy Bob Thornton. The picture is the first feature film directed by Mathew Cullen. After that, Kidnapping Freddy Heineken was filmed in Belgium and New Orleans. Directed by Daniel Alfredson and co-starring Sam Worthington and Anthony Hopkins, filming finished before the end of the year. It was released in 2015. Sturgess portrayed Dutch criminal Cor van Hout.

Music career

Sturgess has been writing and performing his own music since the age of 15. He has appeared in the London music scene for many years in bands such as Saint Faith and Dilated Spies. He has also written music for some of his films, including two tracks that he wrote and performed for Crossing Over, and he collaborated with director Philip Ridley on three tracks that appeared in the film Heartless. Mickey O'Brien, his ex girlfriend, was the composer of the trailer track "Panic And Magic" and Jim provided the vocals.

In 2016, he released five exclusive demos with his band Tragic Toys, to raise funds for a friend with an aggressive form of multiple sclerosis. The music for these demos were written by ex-girlfriend and La Roux member Mickey O'Brien and Sturgess provided the vocals.

Filmography

Film

Television

Discography

Soundtracks

Awards and nominations

2008: Winner, "Best Ensemble" – 21 (shared w/co-stars) at the ShoWest Convention, USA.
2008: Nominated, "Choice Movie Breakout Male" – 21 at the Teen Choice.
2008: Nominated, "Choice Movie Breakout Male" – Across the Universe at the Teen Choice.
2008: Nominated, "Best Performance by an Actor in a Canadian Film" – Fifty Dead Men Walking at Vancouver Film Critics Circle.
2009: First Runner-up, "Best Actor Golden Space Needle Award" – Fifty Dead Men Walking at Seattle International Film Festival.
2009: Nominated, "Best Newcomer" at the Jameson Empire (UK).
2010: Winner, "Best Actor" – Heartless at Fantasporto.

Notes
1.From the soundtrack 21 – Original Motion Picture Score, not to be confused with the film's other soundtrack Music From The Motion Picture 21.

See also

List of people from London
List of British actors
List of singer-songwriters

References

External links

 
 Official Demo Reel by Lamedia Works
 Jim Sturgess talks about his music tastes
 Jim Sturgess interview at Reviewgraveyard.com

1978 births
Living people
People from Wandsworth
People from Farnham
People educated at Frensham Heights School
Alumni of the University of Salford
Male actors from Surrey
Male actors from London
Singers from London
English male television actors
English male film actors
English male singer-songwriters
20th-century English male actors
21st-century English male actors
21st-century English singers
21st-century British male singers